Franklin is an unincorporated community in Lane County, Oregon, United States.

References

Unincorporated communities in Lane County, Oregon
Unincorporated communities in Oregon